The ER200 was a Soviet electric train built in Riga by Rīgas Vagonbūves Rūpnīca. It was the first high-speed Direct Current intercity Electric Multiple Unit (EMU) train with rheostatic brake.
There were two designs. The first design, begun in 1974, was the ER200-1 EMU, and went into commercial operation in 1984. The second design went into operation between Saint Petersburg and Moscow in 1996.

Overall trainset description

Body

Bogies

Main circuit electric equipment
 Supplier: RER
 Control mode: rheostatic step control + TCH
 Traction converter: thyristor DC chopper (TCH)
 Mounting place: under floor Mp
 Semiconductors: thyristors TB353-630-16
 Number of semiconductors: 20
 Nominal output voltage: 3,000 V
 Modulation frequency: 400 Hz
 Cooling system: self-ventilated
 Number of TM in unit: 8
 Number of TM sequences: 2
 Electric brake: rheostatic

Auxiliary electric equipment
 Supplier: RER
 Converter type: rotating machine
 Model: 1PV.004
 Input voltage: 3,000 V
 Output voltage: 3x220 V
 Power: 75.0 kW
 Battery voltage: 110 V

Operational performance
 Design/commercial speed: 200 km/h (124 mph)
 Acceleration (0–60 km/h): 0.4 m/s2 (1.44 km/h/s)
 Service deceleration (80–0 km/h): 0.4 m/s2 (1.44 km/h/s)
 Max service deceleration: 0.6 m/s2 (2.16 km/h/s)
 Emergency deceleration: 1.2 m/s2 (4.32 km/h/s)

See also

 Rīgas Vagonbūves Rūpnīca
 The Museum of the Moscow Railway, at Paveletsky Rail Terminal, Moscow
 Rizhsky Rail Terminal, Home of the Moscow Railway Museum
 Varshavsky Rail Terminal, St.Petersburg, Home of the Central Museum of Railway Transport, Russian Federation
 History of rail transport in Russia
 The EMU pages. ER200.

References

Electric multiple units of Russia
Soviet inventions
High-speed trains of Russia
Rail transport in the Soviet Union
Rolling stock innovations
3000 V DC multiple units